Tell Ada  is a Syrian village located in the Salamiyah Subdistrict in Salamiyah District. According to the Syria Central Bureau of Statistics (CBS), Tell Ada had a population of 1,597 in the 2004 census. Its inhabitants are predominantly Circassians.

References 

Populated places in Salamiyah District
Circassian communities in Syria